Insalebria serraticornella is a species of snout moth in the genus Insalebria. It was described by Zeller in 1839, and is known from Tunisia, Morocco, Slovakia, the Balkan Peninsula, Ukraine, Russia and Turkey.

References

Moths described in 1839
Phycitinae
Moths of Europe
Moths of Africa
Moths of Asia